Emmanuel T Tetteh also Major(Rtd) Emmanuel T Tetteh (born 10 October 1938) is a Ghanaian politician and an Industrialist. He served for Lower Manya Krobo constituency as member of the first parliament of the fourth republic of Ghana in the Eastern Region of Ghana.

Early life and education 
Emmanuel T Tetteh was born on October 10, 1938, in the Eastern Region of Ghana. He attended St. Acquinas Secondary School where he obtained his General Certificate of Education (GCE) Ordinary Level Certificate.

Politics 
Tetteh was elected during the 1992 Ghanaian parliamentary election on the ticket of the National Democratic Congress as member of the first parliament of the fourth republic of Ghana. He lost the seat in 1996 Ghanaian general election to Michael Teye Nyaunu of the National Democratic Congress who won with 24,763 votes out of the 30,963 valid votes cast representing 59.50% over his opponents Kodjiku Lawrence Kpabitey a New Patriotic Party (NPP) member, Robert Kwesi Nartey a People's National Convention (PNC) member, Samuel Terlabie a Convention People's Party (CPP) member and John Tetteh Akuerter an Every Ghanaian Living Everywhere (EGLE) member who polled 5,718 votes which represented 13.70% of the share, 482 votes which represented 1.20% of the share, 0 vote and 0 vote respectively.

Career 
He is a former member of parliament from 7 January 1993 to 7 January 1997 and Industrialist.

Personal life 
He is a Christian.

References 

1938 births
National Democratic Congress (Ghana) politicians
Living people
People from Eastern Region (Ghana)
Ghanaian MPs 1993–1997
20th-century industrialists
Ghanaian Christians
21st-century industrialists